Poly-World (in French: Poly-Monde) - is a student committee based in a French-Canadian engineering school, Polytechnique Montréal, in Montreal (Quebec, Canada).

This committee was founded in 1990 by a group of young students from different engineering fields that wanted to develop their knowledge of business processes, competitiveness and innovation on an international level. These students, François Nadeau, Claude Benoît and Normand Gadoury, therefore organized Poly-Japan, the first mission of what became an independent engineering program orientation at undergraduate level at École Polytechnique.

The primary objective of this student committee is to enable its members to discover competitiveness, innovation and business processes in Quebec companies and then compare their findings on foreign soil through industrial visits to counterpart companies. Each year, the Poly-World council, which includes all coordinators of previous missions and a few teachers, is responsible for the selection of the different industrial sectors that will be studied. These sectors are judged competitive for Quebec and Canada and include aviation, aerospace and pharmaceuticals.

List of past missions

For more details or to consult official documents relative to the missions, visit the Poly-World website.
 2020 Poly-World: Iceland and Norway 
 2019 Poly-World: Japan 
 2018 Poly-World: India 
 2017 Poly-World: Baltic States and Finland 
 2016 Poly-World: United Kingdom and Ireland 
 2015 Poly-World: South Korea 
 2014 Poly-World: Germany 
 2013 Poly-World: Australia
 2012 Poly-World: South Africa
2011 Poly-World: France (visit to Japan canceled due to the 2011 Tōhoku earthquake and tsunami)
2010 Poly-World: Denmark, Netherlands
2009 Poly-Russia 
2008 Poly-World: Taiwan, Hong Kong, Singapore 
2007 Poly-India 
2006 Poly-World: Poland, Czech Republic 
2005 Poly-China 
2004 Poly-Switzerland 
2003 Poly-Scandinavia: Norway, Sweden, Finland 
2002 Poly-Brazil
2001 Poly-Spain
2000 Poly-Korea: South Korea
1999 Poly-Benelux: Belgium, Netherlands, Luxembourg
1998 Poly-America: American west coast
1997 Poly-France
1996 Poly-Germany
1995 Poly-Japan 
1994 Poly-Great Britain
1993 Poly-Italy
1992 Poly-Scandinavia: Norway, Sweden, Finland
1991 Poly-Germany
1990 Poly-Japan

References

External links
  Poly-World official website
  Polytechnique Montréal official website

Université de Montréal